Roger Sackey (born 1 January 1993) is a Ghanaian professional footballer who last played as a midfielder for Ghanaian Premier League side Accra Great Olympics. He previously played for Russian side FC Neftekhimik Nizhnekamsk.

Club career

Early career 
Born in the capital city of Ghana, Accra, Sackey started his career with lower-side Soccer Learners FC before moving to Easy Professional FC.

FC Neftekhimik Nizhnekamsk 
Sackey moved to FC Neftekhimik Nizhnekamsk in 2013. He made his debut in the Russian National Football League for FC Neftekhimik Nizhnekamsk on 23 October 2013 in a game against PFC Spartak Nalchik, coming on as a 58th-minute substitute for Mihai Plătică.

Telephonat Beni Suef 
In 2017, he signed a contract with Egyptian second-tier side Telephonat Beni Suef SC.

Great Olympics 
In February 2019, Sackey signed a two-year deal with Accra-based club Great Olympics. along with veteran forward Bernard Don Bortey. He was named on the club's squad list for the 2020–21 season. He didn't feature until 2020–21 Ghana Premier League. He made his debut in the Ghana Premier League on 17 December 2020 in a 1–0 win against Kumasi Asante Kotoko, coming on in 80th minute for Samuel Quaye. After the expiration of his contract in February 2021, the club announced in March 2021 that they parted with him.

International career 
Sackey featured for the Ghana national under-20 football team in 2012. He was given a call up into the team along with other notable players like Ebenezer Assifuah, Joseph Larweh Attamah, Jacob Asiedu-Apau, Moses Odjer and later Daniel Amartey. In July 2012, he also featured in the three-nation U-20 tournament hosted by Ghana in Accra.

References

External links 

 
 

Living people
1993 births
Association football midfielders
Ghanaian footballers
Ghana Premier League players
Accra Great Olympics F.C. players
FC Neftekhimik Nizhnekamsk players
Russian First League players
Ghanaian expatriate sportspeople in Russia
Ghana youth international footballers